Vallière is a commune in the Creuse department in the Nouvelle-Aquitaine region in central France.

Geography
The commune lies within the natural park of the ‘Millevaches’ (1000 lakes, not cows).

Population

Sights
 The church of St. Martin, dating from the thirteenth century.
 The fourteenth-century château de Villeneuve.
 Two menhirs, at Fraisse and Les Garennes.

See also
Communes of the Creuse department

References

External links

Official commune website 

Communes of Creuse